Feroze Isa Nazir Khushi (born 23 June 1999) is an English cricketer. He made his first-class debut on 1 August 2020, for Essex in the 2020 Bob Willis Trophy. He made his Twenty20 debut 20 September 2020, for Essex in the 2020 t20 Blast. He made his List A debut on 8 August 2021, for Essex in the 2021 Royal London One-Day Cup. He made his maiden first-class hundred on 6 September, playing for Essex in the 2022 County Championship.

References

External links
 

1999 births
Living people
English cricketers
Essex cricketers
Suffolk cricketers
People from the London Borough of Waltham Forest